Trinucleotide repeat containing 18 is a protein that in humans is encoded by the TNRC18 gene.

Function 
The exact function of TNRC18 is not yet well understood by the scientific community. The protein sequence provided by the National Center for Biotechnology Information (NCBI) database includes a Bromo Adjacent Homology (BAH) Domain within TNRC18. BAH domains are often found in chromatin-associated proteins and assist in the silencing of genes.

Gene 
According to the UCSC Genome Browser, TNRC18 is located within Chromosome 7 in humans (chr7: 5,306,800-5,423,546). There are 29 introns and 30 exons listed. Directly preceding TNRC18 is SLC29A4 and immediately following is AC092171.4. SLC29A4 encodes the plasma membrane monoamine transporter in humans.

GeneCards lists five aliases for TNRC18, Long CAG Trinucleotide Repeat-Containing Gene 79 Protein, Trinucleotide Repeat-Containing Gene 18 Protein, CAGL79, KIAA1856, and TNRC18A. Additionally, TNRC18 has two paralogs, BAH Domain And Coiled-Coil Containing 1 (BAHCC1) and Bromo Adjacent Homology Domain Containing 1 (BAHD1).

mRNA and Isoforms 
The NCBI gene page for TNRC18 lists 9 different protein isoforms across 12 transcript variant mRNA sequences. TNRC18 isoform X7 is encoded by mRNA transcript variants X7-X10. Additionally, isoforms X8 and X9 are produced by variants X11 and X12 respectively.

Protein 
The protein sequence provided by NCBI lists human TNRC18 having a length of 2968 amino acids. The Compute pI/Mw tool program by ExPASy predicts the isoelectric point and molecular weight for the TNRC18 to be 8.88 and 315 kDa respectively. Additionally, the NCBI protein sequence for TNRC18 contains nine phosphorylation sites on TNRC18, eight phosphoserines and one phosphothreonine. There is a large serine repeat upstream of the BAH site located from amino acid positions 2604–2670. The BAH site is located on position 2816–2960.

The predicted secondary structure for TNRC18 consists of 32.61% alpha helix, 6.74% extended strand, and 60.55% random coil. This was found using the GOR4 program available at PRABI-Lyon-Gerland with the NCBI protein sequence for TNRC18.

Expression 
RNA sequencing of TNRC18 tissue samples found ubiquitous gene expression. Most prominent expression was observed within the colon, kidney, and prostate tissue samples. In fetal human tissue samples, notable expression was found in the stomach, lung, and brain. RNA sequencing data was acquired though the TNRC18 gene expression page found on NCBI.

The Human Protein Atlas shows highest RNA expression of TNRC18 in the brain, endocrine tissue, and muscle tissue. Additionally, the highest protein expression is observed in the brain, endocrine tissue, lung, gastrointestinal tract, and male and female specific tissues. Conversely, there is no protein expression in the eye or blood tissue, yet ubiquitous RNA expression for TNRC18.

TNRC18 expression in mouse brain can be found below. Noteworthy expression is observed in the olfactory bulb, isocortex, and cerebellar cortex shown in color. This image and brain atlas information is provided by the Allen Institute Brain Atlas.

Homology 
NCBI Protein BLAST search for reference proteins lists the following orthologs for human TNRC18. The table is ordered first by increasing estimated date of divergence from humans in millions of years (MYA) and then by highest-to-lowest sequence identity with humans. Date of divergence information was acquired from TimeTree and sequence identify and similarity percentages were found by a pairwise sequence alignment using the European Bioinformatics Institute (EMBL-EBI) EMBOSS Needle program.

Predicted post-translational modifications and motifs 
The following post-translational modifications and motifs are predicted for TNRC18 and found on the ExPASy Proteomics page. Exception to GPS-MSP methylation program which is found on The Cuckoo Workgroup site. This list is not conclusive of the total post-translational modifications or motifs associated with TNRC18 and is solely based on software predictions.

Of the predicted post-translational modifications, there are 92 O-Linked β-N-acetylglucosamine (O-ß-GlcNAc) sites with a high scoring threshold (>=0.5), 23 Sumoylation sites, two palmitoylation sites, one methylation site, and 52 glycation sites. Additionally, GPS 5.0 predicted 22,317 phosphorylation sites on TNRC18. The program was used to confirm the nine phosphorylation sites found on the NCBI protein page for TNRC18.

Clinical significance 
Shen et al. observed circTNRC18 inhibiting miR-762 activity within pre-eclampsia (PE) placenta tissue samples. The inhibition of miR-762 by circTNRC18 resulted in elevated Grhl2 protein levels. PE placenta samples were observed to have lower miR-762 levels and higher Grhl2 levels which was attributed to overexpression of circTNRC18. Shen et al. conclude that circTNRC18 was upregulated in PE placentas when compared with normal pregnancy placentas.

Chu et al. found that from 19 CpG sites linked with glomerular filtration rate (eGFR), 5 were also linked with renal fibrosis and DNA methylation occurrences in the kidney cortex of chronic kidney disease (CKD) patients. Chu et. note that reduced eGFR is a defining feature of (CKD). These 5 CpG sites were found in proteins TNRC18, PTPN6/PHB2, ANKRD11, PQLC2, and PRPF8. Chu et al. conclude that epigenetic variation may be associated with CKD.

References